Joseph-Auguste Charlot (21 January 1827 – August 1871) was a French composer.

Life 
Charlot began his musical education at the Conservatoire de Paris at the age of ten. He studied piano with Pierre Zimmermann and musical composition with Michele Carafa. In 1838, at the age of eleven, he received the first prize in solfège. The first prize for piano followed in 1841, the one for harmony and accompaniment in 1842. In 1850 he won the first prize of the Prix de Rome with the cantata Emma et Eginhard.

After his stay in Rome Charlot became an accompanist, later choirmaster at the Opéra-Comique. In 1866 he succeeded Eugène Vauthrot as choirmaster of the Orchestre de la Société des Concerts du Conservatoire. The Hartmann publishing house published the collection Dix mélodies from his estate.

1827 births
1871 deaths
Musicians from Nancy, France
Conservatoire de Paris alumni
French Romantic composers
19th-century French composers
French male classical composers
Prix de Rome for composition
19th-century French male musicians